William Edward Friel (April 1, 1876 – December 24, 1959) was an American professional baseball player. He played three seasons in Major League Baseball, as a second baseman, third baseman and outfielder.

Friel began his career in the minor leagues in 1895. In 1901, he played for the Milwaukee Brewers, and remained with the franchise in 1902-03 after it moved to St. Louis and became the Browns. He continued playing in the minor leagues until 1912, becoming the player-manager of the Columbus Senators of the American Association in 1910. He managed in the minor leagues for several more years afterwards.
From 1923-1932 he served as the Business Manager for the St. Louis Browns.
His last job in baseball was as the manager for the 1940 St. Augustine Saints
of the Florida State League.

References

External links

Major League Baseball infielders
Milwaukee Brewers (1901) players
St. Louis Browns players
Atlanta Crackers players
Niagara Purple Eagles baseball players
Providence Grays (minor league) players
Providence Clamdiggers (baseball) players
Cortland Hirelings players
Springfield Ponies players
Springfield Maroons players
Pawtucket Tigers players
New Haven Blues players
Columbus Senators players
Indianapolis Indians players
Minneapolis Millers (baseball) players
Springfield Babes (baseball) players
Milwaukee Brewers (minor league) managers
St. Paul Saints (AA) managers
Baseball players from Pennsylvania
1876 births
1959 deaths